The Government of Penang refers to the government authority of the Malaysian state of Penang. The state government adheres to and is created by both the Constitution of Malaysia, the supreme law of Malaysia, and the Constitution of the State of Penang, the supreme law in Penang. The government of Penang is based in the state's capital city of George Town.

The state government consists of only two branches - executive and legislative. The Penang State Executive Council forms the executive branch, whilst the Penang State Legislative Assembly is the legislature of the state government. Penang's head of government is the chief minister. The state government does not have a judiciary branch, as Malaysia's judicial system is a federalised system operating uniformly throughout the country.

Executive

Head of government 

The Chief Minister is the head of government in Penang. He is officially appointed by the Governor, Penang's head of state, on the basis of the latter's judgement that the former commands the confidence of the majority of the State Assemblymen in the Penang State Legislative Assembly. The Chief Minister and his Executive Council shall be collectively responsible to Legislative Assembly. The Office of the Chief Minister is situated inside Komtar in George Town.

The current Chief Minister of Penang is Chow Kon Yeow of the Democratic Action Party (DAP), which controls the most seats in the State Legislative Assembly among the Pakatan Harapan (PH) component parties. Chow was sworn in on 14 May 2018, after the 2018 State Election that saw the PH coalition retaining power in Penang. To this day, Penang remains the only Malaysian state where the position of the head of government has been continuously held by an ethnic Chinese since the nation's independence in 1957.

Notably, Penang is also the only Malaysian state which appoints two Deputy Chief Ministers - one representing the Malay community and the other an ethnic Indian. This serves to shape a top leadership consisting of various backgrounds, representing the diverse ethnicities of the state.

Cabinet 

The Penang State Executive Council forms the executive branch of the Penang state government and is analogous in function to the Malaysian federal Cabinet. The Executive Council comprises the Chief Minister, and between four and 10 other State Assemblymen from the Penang State Legislative Assembly. Aside from these, three other ex officio members of the Executive Council are the State Secretary, the State Legal Adviser and the State Financial Officer.

Following the 2018 State Election, the members of the Executive Council are as follows.

Legislature

The Penang State Legislative Assembly is the legislative branch of the Penang state government. The unicameral legislature consists of 40 seats that represent the 40 state constituencies within Penang, with each constituency being represented by an elected State Assemblyman. The Legislative Assembly convenes at the Penang State Assembly Building in George Town.

The legislature has a maximum mandate of five years by law and follows a multi-party system; the ruling party (or coalition) is elected through a first-past-the-post system. The Governor may dissolve the legislature at any time and usually does so upon the advice of the Chief Minister.

A Speaker is elected by the Legislative Assembly to preside over the proceedings and debates of the legislature. The Speaker may or may not be an elected State Assemblyman; in the case of the latter, the elected Speaker shall become a member of the Legislative Assembly additional to the elected State Assemblymen already in the legislature.

Departments, agencies and statutory bodies

Departments 

 Penang State Treasury Department
 Penang State Mufti Department
 Penang Syariah Judiciary Department
 Office of Lands and Mines Penang
 Penang Town and Country Planning Department
 Penang Islamic Religious Affairs Department
 Penang Irrigation and Drainage Department
 Penang Public Works Department
 Penang Social Welfare Department
 Penang State Agriculture Department
 Penang Veterinary Services Department
 Penang State Forestry Department
 Penang Botanic Gardens Department
 Penang State Sports Council

Agencies 

 Penang Development Corporation
 Penang Public Library Corporation
 Penang State Museum Board
 Penang State Islamic Religious Council
 Penang Hill Corporation

Statutory bodies 

 George Town World Heritage Incorporated
 investPenang
 Penang Career Assistance & Talent Centre
 Penang Global Tourism
 Penang Green Council
 Penang Hindu Endowment Board
 Penang Institute of Integrity
 Penang International Halal Hub
 Penang Water Supply Corporation

See also 

 Chief Minister of Penang
 Local governments in Penang
 Penang Island City Council
 Seberang Perai City Council
 Elections in Penang

References 

 
Politics of Penang